is a Japanese manga artist. She is widely known as the creator of Aria, which proved to be a best-selling hit, and was adapted into an anime television series consisting of 3 seasons and 2 OVAs.

As of autumn 2010, Amano's work releases have been shifted from a monthly schedule to a seasonal one (every 3 months) owing to pregnancy and subsequent childcare.

Works
  (1995–1996, serialized in Monthly Shōnen Gangan, Enix); (2005 reprint by Mag Garden)
  – Amano Kozue Tanpenshū 1, a collection of short stories (1996, Enix); (2004 reprint by Mag Garden)
  (1997–2001, serialized in Monthly GFantasy, Enix)
  – Amano Kozue Tanpenshu 2, a collection of short stories (1999, Enix); (2004 reprint by Mag Garden)
 , also known as Princess' Smile, (2000, Enix)
  (2001, serialized Monthly Stencil, Enix); (2003 reprint by Mag Garden)
  (2002–2008, serialized in Monthly Comic Blade, Mag Garden)
  (2008–2021, serialized in Monthly Comic Blade, Mag Garden)

References

External links

Women manga artists
1974 births
Living people
Female comics writers
Japanese female comics artists
People from Saitama (city)
20th-century Japanese women writers
20th-century Japanese writers
21st-century Japanese women writers
21st-century Japanese writers
Manga artists from Saitama Prefecture